British Journal of Educational Studies is a peer-reviewed academic journal of educational studies established in 1952. The journal is published by Taylor & Francis on behalf of the Society for Educational Studies. The editor-in-chief is Gary McCulloch (UCL Institute of Education).

Abstracting and indexing 
The journal is indexed and abstracted in:

In 2018, the journal had an impact factor of 2.298, ranking it 48th out of 243 journals in the category "Education & Educational Research".

References

External links
 British Journal of Educational Studies website
 Society for Educational Studies  website

Education journals
English-language journals
History of education in the United Kingdom
Publications established in 1952
Taylor & Francis academic journals
Quarterly journals